Hughie McMahon (24 September 1909 – October 1986) was an English professional footballer who played as a winger for Sunderland.

References

1909 births
1986 deaths
People from Grangetown, North Yorkshire
English footballers
Association football wingers
South Bank St Peters F.C. players
Mexborough Town F.C. players
Reading F.C. players
Southend United F.C. players
Queens Park Rangers F.C. players
Sunderland A.F.C. players
Hartlepool United F.C. players
Rotherham United F.C. players
Stockton F.C. players
English Football League players